Bukunyi Olateru-Olagbegi is a Nigerian entrepreneur and politician. He is a member of the royal  Olagbegi family in Owo, a city in Ondo State, southwestern Nigeria. He is the founder and chairman of the Modern Democratic Party. In 2018, Bukunyi's contribution to Nigerian politics was a feature of a Forbes Africa magazine article on the 2019 Nigerian elections, which credited him as one of Nigeria's young leading political figures, and in 2019 he was named among the 100 Most Influential People of African Descent (MIPAD) under the United Nations.

Career
Bukunyi is the CEO of FBSS Nigeria Limited, he also serves on the board of Altheus Limited, a notable Nigerian firm with interests in Energy, Human Capacity Development and Private equity. In 2016 Bukunyi was appointed as the Chairman of the Central Working Committee for The Future Awards. He also serves as the Chairman of the Central working Committee for SME100 Nigeria.

Politics
In 2018, sequel to the passage of the #NotTooYoungToRun Bill at the Nigerian National Assembly, Bukunyi at age 27, successfully registered a political party, ‘Modern Democratic Party’ with the Independent National Electoral Commission. The party has been described as representing the new face of active youth involvement in politics in Nigeria.

In November 2018, his party the MDP unveiled singer and filmmaker Bankole Wellington (Banky W.), as its candidate to contest the 2019 Federal House of Representatives elections, representing Eti-Osa Constituency, who eventually lost to the ruling APC candidate, Ibrahim Babajide Obanikoro in a keenly contested race. The party is reported to have 65,000 members and fielded two legislative candidates in the 2019 General Elections in Nigeria.

In December 2018, Bukunyi's contribution to Nigerian politics was a feature of a Forbes Africa magazine article on the 2019 Nigerian elections.

Personal life
Bukunyi married Nigerian singer Mo’Cheddah in May 2018 at a private ceremony in Lagos, Nigeria.

References 

Living people
Yoruba politicians
Politicians from Ondo State
Yoruba businesspeople
21st-century Nigerian businesspeople
1990 births